The 1909–10 Butler Bulldogs men's basketball team represented the Butler University during the 1909–10 college men's basketball season. The head coach was Walter Gipe, coaching his first season with the Bulldogs.

Schedule

|-

References

Butler Bulldogs men's basketball seasons
Butler
Butl
Butl